New moon is a lunar phase.

New Moon or The New Moon may also refer to:

Film and stage
 The New Moon (1919 film), an American film starring Norma Talmadge
 New Moon (1925 film), an Italian silent film
 The New Moon, a 1928 operetta
 New Moon (1930 film), an adaptation of the operetta starring Lawrence Tibbett and Grace Moore
 New Moon (1940 film), an adaptation of the operetta starring Jeanette MacDonald and Nelson Eddy
 New Moon (1955 film), an Italian film
 The Twilight Saga: New Moon, a 2009 film adaptation of the Stephenie Meyer novel
 The Twilight Saga: New Moon (soundtrack)

Music
 New Moon (Abderrahmane Abdelli album), 1995
 New Moon (Northern Lights album), 2005
 New Moon (Elliott Smith album), 2007
 New Moon (Swallow the Sun album), 2009
 New Moon (The Men album), 2013
 New Moon (EP), by AOA, 2019
 "New Moon", a song by MØ from her 2022 album Motordrome
 "New Moon", a song by House of Heroes
 "The New Moon", a song by Irving Berlin
 The New Moon (music venue), a rock music venue in Paris during the 1990s

Printed media
 New Moon (magazine), a bi-monthly for girls
 New Moon (novel), a 2006 novel by Stephenie Meyer and the second novel in the Twilight series
 New Moon: The Graphic Novel, a 2013 comic book by Young Kim

Other uses
 New Moon (company), a film production company based in Soho, London
 New Moon, a character on the DC Comics team the Moondancers
 Rosh Chodesh, the first day of the month in the Hebrew calendar

See also
 New Moon Rising (disambiguation)
 New Moonta, a rural locality in Queensland, Australia